Henry Franklin Floyd (born November 5, 1947) is a Senior United States circuit judge of the United States Court of Appeals for the Fourth Circuit.

Early life and education 

Born on November 5, 1947, in Brevard, North Carolina, Floyd received a Bachelor of Arts from Wofford College in 1970 and a Juris Doctor from the University of South Carolina School of Law in 1973.

Professional career 

Floyd served in the South Carolina House of Representatives from 1972 to 1978. He was elected as a Democrat. Floyd was in private practice in South Carolina from 1973 to 1992. He was a South Carolina Circuit Court judge, Thirteenth Judicial Circuit Court of South Carolina from 1992 to 2003.

Federal judicial service

District court service 
On May 15, 2003, Floyd was nominated by President George W. Bush to a seat on the United States District Court for the District of South Carolina vacated by Dennis Shedd. Floyd was confirmed by the United States Senate on September 22, 2003, and received his commission on September 24, 2003. His service terminated on October 6, 2011, due to elevation to the Fourth Circuit.

Floyd presided over the case of José Padilla, a United States citizen detained by President Bush as an enemy combatant. In 2005, Floyd ruled that Bush did not have the authority to hold Padilla as an enemy combatant.

Court of appeals service 

On January 26, 2011, President Barack Obama nominated Floyd to serve on the United States Court of Appeals for the Fourth Circuit. Floyd was recommended by Republican Senator Lindsey Graham and Democratic Representatives Jim Clyburn and John Spratt. The United States Senate confirmed Floyd on October 3, 2011 by a 96–0 vote. He received his commission on October 5, 2011.  Floyd assumed senior status on December 31, 2021.

Notable cases 
On 28 July 2014, Floyd, in a 2–1 ruling joined by Judge Roger Gregory, struck down Virginia's ban on same-sex marriage as unconstitutional. He ruled that "Neither Virginia’s federalism-based interest in defining marriage nor our respect for the democratic process that codified that definition can excuse the Virginia Marriage Laws’ infringement of the right to marry... We recognize that same-sex marriage makes some people deeply uncomfortable. However, inertia and apprehension are not legitimate bases for denying same-sex couples due process and equal protection of the laws."

In August 2020, Floyd wrote the majority opinion in G. G. v. Gloucester County School Board. In a 2-1 decision, the court ruled for Gavin Grimm, a transgender man who had sued the Gloucester County School Board in Virginia who had prohibited him from using the boys' bathroom. Floyd wrote “At the heart of this appeal is whether equal protection and Title IX can protect transgender students from school bathroom policies that prohibit them from affirming their gender. We join a growing consensus of courts in holding that the answer is resoundingly yes.”

References

External links 

1947 births
Living people
21st-century American judges
Judges of the United States Court of Appeals for the Fourth Circuit
Judges of the United States District Court for the District of South Carolina
Members of the South Carolina House of Representatives
People from Brevard, North Carolina
South Carolina state court judges
United States court of appeals judges appointed by Barack Obama
United States district court judges appointed by George W. Bush
University of South Carolina School of Law alumni
Wofford College alumni